Heterlimnius is a genus of riffle beetles in the family Elmidae. There are about 16 described species in Heterlimnius.

Species
These 16 species belong to the genus Heterlimnius:

 Heterlimnius amabilis Kamite, 2011
 Heterlimnius ater (Nomura, 1958)
 Heterlimnius corpulentus (LeConte, 1874)
 Heterlimnius ennearthrus Kamite, 2009
 Heterlimnius hasegawai (Nomura, 1958)
 Heterlimnius hisamatsui Kamite, 2009
 Heterlimnius horii Kamite, 2012
 Heterlimnius ikedai Kamite, 2011
 Heterlimnius jaechi Kamite, 2009
 Heterlimnius koebelei (Martin, 1927)
 Heterlimnius quadrigibbus Kamite, 2012
 Heterlimnius samlandica (Bollow, 1940)
 Heterlimnius shepardi Kamite, 2009
 Heterlimnius trachys (Janssens, 1959)
 Heterlimnius vietnamensis Kamite, 2011
 Heterlimnius yokoii Kamite, 2012

References

Further reading

 
 
 
 
 

Elmidae
Articles created by Qbugbot